I'm Not Me is the second solo album by Mick Fleetwood. This album is credited to the British-American rock band Mick Fleetwood's Zoo and features contributions from Fleetwood Mac members Christine McVie and Lindsey Buckingham. Billy Burnette, who performs some of the lead vocals on this album as a member of Mick Fleetwood’s Zoo, would later join Fleetwood Mac in 1987 following the departure of Buckingham.

George Hawkins, who performed most of the lead vocals on Fleetwood’s first solo album The Visitor, performs some of the lead vocals on this album as a member of Mick Fleetwood’s Zoo.

Track listing

Personnel
Mick Fleetwood – drums, percussion
Billy Burnette – guitar, vocals
George Hawkins – bass guitar, keyboards, vocals
Steve Ross – guitar, vocals

Additional personnel
Lindsey Buckingham – guitar, keyboards, vocals
Jon Clarke – saxophone
Vince Denham – saxophone
Don Roberts – tenor saxophone
Christine McVie – keyboards, vocals
Todd Sharp – guitar
Ron Thompson – rhythm guitar, slide guitar

References

1983 albums
Mick Fleetwood albums
Albums produced by Richard Dashut
Albums produced by Mick Fleetwood
RCA Records albums